In enzymology, a valine decarboxylase is an enzyme that catalyzes the chemical reaction

L-valine  2-methylpropanamine + CO2

Hence, this enzyme has one substrate, L-valine, and two products, 2-methylpropanamine and CO2.

This enzyme belongs to the family of lyases, specifically the carboxy-lyases, which cleave carbon-carbon bonds.  The systematic name of this enzyme class is L-valine carboxy-lyase (2-methylpropanamine-forming). Other names in common use include leucine decarboxylase and L-valine carboxy-lyase.  It employs one cofactor, pyridoxal phosphate.

References 

 

EC 4.1.1
Pyridoxal phosphate enzymes
Enzymes of unknown structure